Kancherkol Union is a union parishad situated at Shailkupa Upazila,  in Jhenaidah District, Khulna Division of Bangladesh. There are 14 villages and 5 mouzas in the union.

References

External links
 

Unions of Khulna Division
Unions of Shailkupa Upazila
Unions of Jhenaidah District